Hyoscine is a medication used to treat motion sickness and postoperative nausea and vomiting.

Hyoscine may also refer to:

 Hyoscine butylbromide (brand name Buscopan), used for crampy abdominal pain, renal colic, or bladder spasms
 Hyoscine methobromide

See also
 Hyoscyamine